The St. Catharines Blue Jays were a minor league baseball team which played at Community Park in St. Catharines, Ontario. They were the Short-Season A affiliate of the Toronto Blue Jays in the New York–Penn League.

History
The team began play in 1986 as the Blue Jays, though were later renamed the St. Catharines Stompers in 1995.  The team left St. Catharines after the 1999 season to become the Queens Kings in 2000.

On 4 July 2007, it was reported in the St. Catharines Standard the Stompers were going to return in the summer of 2008. Former team owner, Terrence O'Malley was quoted as saying: "the Stompers are back ... We'll be playing at Community Park beginning next summer." This article prompted a number of responses, though, in the end this turned out to be only a satirical piece.

The Blue Jays won the New York-Penn league title in 1986.

Notable players

Managers

 Cloyd Boyer 1986
 Joe Lonnett 1987
 Eddie Dennis 1988
 Bob Shirley 1989
 Doug Ault 1990–1991
 Joe Cannon 1992–1995

As Stompers
 Rocket Wheeler 1996–1997
 Duane Larson 1998
 Eddie Rodriguez 1999

References

Baseball teams established in 1986
Sports clubs disestablished in 1999
Defunct New York–Penn League teams
Defunct baseball teams in Canada
Sport in St. Catharines
Toronto Blue Jays minor league affiliates
Baseball teams in Ontario
1986 establishments in Ontario
1999 establishments in Ontario